This is a comprehensive list of songs recorded by Japanese alternative rock band L'Arc-en-Ciel. Since the band formed in 1991, it has released twelve studio albums.

Table

References

L'Arc En Ciel